Douglas Joseph Camilli (born September 22, 1936) is an American former catcher and coach in Major League Baseball who played from 1960–67 and in 1969 for the Los Angeles Dodgers and Washington Senators. The son of the late MLB first baseman and slugger Dolph Camilli, he was born in Philadelphia during his father's tenure with the Phillies.

Camilli graduated from Santa Rosa High School (Santa Rosa, California) and attended Stanford University before signing in 1957 with the Brooklyn Dodgers, for whom his father was the  National League Most Valuable Player.  In , his first full big-league season, Camilli appeared in 45 games played, backing up John Roseboro and Norm Sherry, and batting a career-high .284 with four home runs and 22 runs batted in.  But he struggled at the plate for the remainder of his MLB career.

Camilli caught the third of Sandy Koufax's four career no-hitters on June 4, 1964.   Koufax came within one base on balls of a perfect game, striking out 12 and beating the Phillies, 3–0, at Connie Mack Stadium.  Appearing in 313 MLB games over all or parts of nine seasons, Camilli collected 153 hits. He won a World Series ring as a member of the 1963 Dodgers, but did not appear in that year's Fall Classic, a four-game sweep over the New York Yankees.

Camilli's active playing career effectively ended in September 1967. He served as a bullpen coach for the Senators (–69), but was activated during the September 1969 roster expansion and appeared in his final big-league game as a catcher on September 14 against the Detroit Tigers.  He then joined the Boston Red Sox (–73) as full-time bullpen coach, and later was a manager, coach and roving catching instructor in the Red Sox farm system through .

See also
List of second-generation Major League Baseball players

References

External links

 
 

1936 births
Living people
Atlanta Crackers players
Baseball players from Pennsylvania
Boston Red Sox coaches
Great Falls Electrics players
Green Bay Bluejays players
Los Angeles Dodgers players
Major League Baseball bullpen coaches
Major League Baseball catchers
Minor league baseball managers
Omaha Dodgers players
People from Winter Haven, Florida
Reno Silver Sox players
Spokane Indians players
Sportspeople from Santa Rosa, California
Stanford Cardinal baseball players
Washington Senators (1961–1971) coaches
Washington Senators (1961–1971) players